The 2019–20 SV Darmstadt 98 season was the 122nd season in the football club's history and their 20th overall season in the second tier of German football, the 2. Bundesliga. It was the club's third consecutive season in the second division, since relegation from the Bundesliga in 2016-17.

Squad

Squad information

Transfers

In

Out

Competitions

2. Bundesliga

League table

Results summary

Matches

DFB-Pokal

Notes

References

SV Darmstadt 98 seasons
Darmstadt